Church of Resurrection of Christ is an Orthodox church building under construction in Kumanovo, North Macedonia. Construction started on 25 of April 2014.

See also
 Kumanovo

References

Churches in Kumanovo
Macedonian Orthodox churches
Churches completed in 2015